John Frederick Finerty (September 10, 1846 – June 10, 1908) was a U.S. Representative from Illinois.

Biography
Born in Galway, Ireland, Finerty completed preparatory studies. He immigrated to the United States in 1864. He enlisted in the Union Army during the Civil War and served in the Ninety-ninth Regiment, New York State Militia. He was a war correspondent for the Chicago Times in the Sioux War of 1876, in the Northern Indian (Sioux) War of 1879, in the Ute campaign of 1879, and afterward in the Apache campaign of 1881. He was a correspondent in Washington, D.C. during the sessions of the Forty-sixth Congress (1879–1881). He established the Citizen, a weekly newspaper, in Chicago in 1882.

Finerty was elected as an Independent Democrat to the Forty-eighth Congress (March 4, 1883 – March 3, 1885). He served as member of the board of local improvements 1906-1908. He died in Chicago, and was interred in Calvary Cemetery.

Author of two-volume "Ireland:  The People's History of Ireland" (1904) New York and London: The Co-operative Publication Society.

Author of "War-path and bivoac: The Conquest of the Sioux" (1890), considered a classic account of the Great Sioux War of 1876-1877. He also wrote a thorough but unoriginal 2-volume "People's History of Ireland" by 1904.

References

 John Finerty's account of The Battle of the Rosebud (taken in 1894)

 Retrieved on 2008-11-05

1846 births
1908 deaths
Members of the United States House of Representatives from Illinois
Politicians from Chicago
American newspaper reporters and correspondents
People of the Great Sioux War of 1876
Union Army soldiers
People from Galway (city)
Politicians from County Galway
Irish emigrants to the United States (before 1923)
American war correspondents
Illinois Independents
Illinois Democrats
Independent Democrat members of the United States House of Representatives
Editors of Illinois newspapers
Journalists from South Dakota
Journalists from North Dakota
19th-century American politicians
Burials at Calvary Cemetery (Evanston, Illinois)